The men's coxed pair rowing competition at the 1980 Summer Olympics took place at Krylatskoye Sports Complex Canoeing and Rowing Basin, Moscow, Soviet Union. The event was held from 20 to 27 July. There were 11 boats (33 competitors) from 11 nations, with each nation limited to a single boat in the event. The event was won by Harald Jährling, Friedrich-Wilhelm Ulrich, and coxswain Georg Spohr of East Germany, the first men to successfully repeat as Olympic champions in the event (Conn Findlay was the only previous man to have two gold medals in the coxed pair, winning non-consecutively in 1956 and 1964 with different crews). It was also the first time that a crew of the same three men earned multiple medals of any colour. East Germany's three straight medals matched the United States (with gold in 1932, 1956, and 1964) for most among nations to that point. Silver went to the Soviet Union again, though with an entirely different team from its 1976 runner-up crew; the silver medalists this time were Viktor Pereverzev, Gennadi Kryuçkin, and cox Aleksandr Lukyanov. Duško Mrduljaš, Zlatko Celent, and cox Josip Reić earned Yugoslavia's first medal in the event with their bronze.

Background

This was the 15th appearance of the event. Rowing had been on the programme in 1896 but was cancelled due to bad weather. The men's coxed pair was one of the original four events in 1900, but was not held in 1904, 1908, or 1912. It returned to the programme after World War I and was held every Games from 1924 to 1992, when it (along with the men's coxed four) was replaced with the men's lightweight double sculls and men's lightweight coxless four.

Six of the 18 competitors from the 1976 coxed pair Final A returned, two full crews: gold medal winners Harald Jährling, Friedrich-Wilhelm Ulrich, and cox Georg Spohr of East Germany and fourth-place finishers Rumen Khristov, Tsvetan Petkov, and cox Todor Kishev of Bulgaria. The East Germans were heavily favoured, with the nation having taken the gold medals in the 1972 and 1976 Olympics and 1975, 1978, and 1979 World Championships (Spohr was on the 1979 Worlds team; the three together had finished second at the 1977 Worlds). Czechoslovakia was the primary challenger, with two consecutive Worlds silvers as well as Olympic medals in 1972 (silver) and 1976 (bronze); Josef Plamínek, Milan Škopek, and Oldřich Hejdušek were the 1979 runner-up crew.

Ireland made its debut in the event. France made its 13th appearance, most among nations to that point.

Competition format

The coxed pair event featured three-person boats, with two rowers and a coxswain. It was a sweep rowing event, with the rowers each having one oar (and thus each rowing on one side). The course used the 2000 metres distance that became the Olympic standard in 1912. The competition consisted of two main rounds (semifinals and finals) as well as a repechage after the semifinals.

 The 11 boats were divided into two heats for the semifinals, with 5 or 6 boats in each heat. The top boat in each heat advanced directly to the "A" final (2 boats total). The remaining 9 boats competed in the repechage.
 The 9 boats in the repechage competed in two heats, with 4 or 5 boats in each. The top two boats in each heat (4 boats total) advanced to the "A" final, while the remaining 5 boats were eliminated from medal contention and placed in the "B" final.
 There were two finals: the "A" final featured the top six boats, awarding medals and 4th through 6th places, while the "B" final ranked the remaining boats 7th through 11th.

Schedule

All times are Moscow Time (UTC+3)

Results

Semifinals

Winner of each heat advanced to Final A. The remaining teams must compete in repechage for the remaining spots in the "A" final or be placed in the "B" final.

Semifinal 1

Semifinal 2

Repechage

The top two finishers in each heat advanced to the "A" final. All others went to the "B" final, out of medal contention.

Repechage heat 1

Repechage heat 2

Finals

Final B

Final A

References

Sources

Rowing at the 1980 Summer Olympics
Men's events at the 1980 Summer Olympics